Steve White (born 2 January 1959 in Chipping Sodbury) is a retired professional football forward and manager.

Playing career
White's career spanned over 500 appearances for nine league clubs, including Bristol Rovers, Luton Town, Swindon Town and Cardiff City. 
He helped Swindon in several promotion campaigns and played a crucial role in the 1993 play-off victory over Leicester City at Wembley Stadium when he came off the bench to win a penalty. White is still held in great affection at the County Ground. His time at the club was notable for frequently straying offside, pulling his shorts up high and invariably scoring many goals. He was a very awkward player to play against for opposition centre halves. The esteem for White was demonstrated when he returned to Swindon with Hereford for a cup tie. His goal for the visitors was cheered equally heartily by home fans as away. White came second in the BBC Football Focus Swindon Cult Heroes poll behind Don Rogers 

In August 1994 he signed for Hereford United and quickly became a fan favourite ("Chalky" White) at Edgar Street by scoring 44 goals in 76 league appearances. 1995–96 was arguably his best playing season when his prolific strike rate propelled Hereford from 19th to 6th in two months. His 29 league goals made him top goalscorer in the top four English divisions. After failing to gain promotion via the play-offs, he left Hereford and signed for Cardiff City. Whilst at Cardiff he played 6 games on Loan at Cwmbran Town scoring 4 goals in the time he was there.

He was initially in the frame for Bath City's managerial post but instead joined as player assistant to Paul Bodin in June 1998. He scored 12 times in his first season at Twerton Park showing even at 40 years of age he had lost little of his skill in front of goal. White reduced his appearances during the next two years to an occasional outing and left the club in February 2001 in an attempt to return to the professional game in a coaching capacity.

He became director of football at Southampton's academy, and became manager of Chippenham Town in November 2003. He resigned in June 2005 after applying for the vacant managerial post at Bath City.

References

External links

Living people
1959 births
English footballers
Mangotsfield United F.C. players
Swindon Town F.C. players
Bristol Rovers F.C. players
Luton Town F.C. players
Charlton Athletic F.C. players
Lincoln City F.C. players
Hereford United F.C. players
Cardiff City F.C. players
Cwmbrân Town A.F.C. players
Bath City F.C. players
Association football forwards
Premier League players
Cymru Premier players
English Football League players
People from Chipping Sodbury
Sportspeople from Gloucestershire
English football managers
Chippenham Town F.C. managers